George Joseph Garland (1856–1950) was a member of the New Zealand Legislative Council from 7 May 1918 to 6 May 1925; then 7 May 1925 to 6 May 1932, when his term ended. He was appointed by the Reform Government.

He was from Auckland.

References 

1856 births
1950 deaths
Members of the New Zealand Legislative Council
Reform Party (New Zealand) MLCs
People from Auckland